The lithospheric mantle is the portion of the lithosphere within the mantle, as opposed to the crust.  It is solid, and is the uppermost part of the mantle.

The lithospheric mantle is subdivided into the subcontinental lithospheric mantle (associated with the continental lithosphere) and oceanic lithospheric mantle (associated with the oceanic lithosphere).

References

Earth's mantle